Sion Jones (born 1979 in Denbigh) is a Welsh racing cyclist. He represented Wales at the 1998 Commonwealth Games in Kuala Lumpur. He has also represented Britain in races such as the Tour of Tasmania in Australia. He has been a multiple British national champion and a national record holder.

Palmarès
1997
1st Team Pursuit 1997 British National Team Pursuit Championships
1998
4th Team Pursuit, 4m 28.664, Commonwealth Games (with Paul Sheppard, Alun Owen and Huw Pritchard)

2006
1st 20km Scratch, Welsh National Track Championships
2nd Pursuit, Welsh National Track Championships
2nd Kilo, Welsh National Track Championships

References

1979 births
Living people
Sportspeople from St Asaph
Commonwealth Games competitors for Wales
Cyclists at the 1998 Commonwealth Games
Cyclists at the 2002 Commonwealth Games
Welsh track cyclists
Welsh male cyclists
People from Denbigh
Sportspeople from Denbighshire